August 18 - Eastern Orthodox liturgical calendar - August 20

All fixed commemorations below are observed on September 1 by Eastern Orthodox Churches on the Old Calendar.

For August 19, Orthodox Churches on the Old Calendar commemorate the Saints listed on August 6.

Feasts

 Afterfeast of the Dormition.

Saints

 Martyr Andrew Stratelates and 2,593 soldier-martyrs with him, in Cilicia (284-305)
 Martyrs Timothy, Agapius, and Thecla, of Palestine (304)
 Martyrs Eutychianus, Strategius and Myron, by fire (304)

Pre-Schism Western saints

 Saint Julius, an early martyr in Rome (c. 190)
 Saint Rufinus, a saint venerated in Mantua in Italy from early times, confessor.
 Saint Marianus, a hermit in the forest of Entreaigues in Berry in France, confessor (c. 515)
 Saint Donatus, born in Orleans in France, he lived as a hermit on Mt Jura near Sisteron in Provence (c. 535)
 Saint Elaphius, Bishop of Châlons-sur-Marne in France (580)
 Saint Mochta (Mochteus), possibly born in Wales, he founded the monastery of Louth in Ireland (6th century)
 Saint Bertulf of Bobbio, a monk at Luxeuil in France, then went to Bobbio in Italy where he became abbot on the repose of St Attalas (640)
 Saint Magnus of Avignon (660) 
 Saint Calminius (Calmilius), a hermit who founded the monasteries of Villars and Mauzac near Riom in France (c. 690)
 Saint Guenninus, Bishop of Vannes in Brittany (7th century)
 Saint Namadie (Namadia), wife of St Calminius, as a widow she became a nun at Marsat in France (c. 700)
 Saint Sebaldus, probably born in England, he lived as a hermit near Vicenza in Italy, then preached with St Willibald in the Reichswald in Germany (c. 770)
 Saint Credan, eighth Abbot of Evesham Abbey (780)
 Saint Marinus, Bishop at the monastery of St Peter in Besalú in Catalonia in Spain (c. 800)
 Saint Badulf (Badour, Badolf), a monk and Abbot of Ainay, near Lyons in France (850)
 Saint Leovigild and Christopher, monks, martyred in Cordoba under Abderrahman II (852)

Post-Schism Orthodox saints

 Saint Pitirim, Bishop of Perm (1455)
 Venerable Theophanes of Docheiariou monastery, the New Wonderworker (16th century)

New martyrs and confessors

 Saint Nicholas Lebedev, Priest of Tver, New-Martyr (1933)

Other commemorations

 "Donskoy" Icon of the Most Holy Theotokos (Theotokos "Of the Don") (1591)
 Uncovering of the relics (1646) of St. Gennadius, Abbot of Kostroma (1565)
 Repose of Abbess Maria (Ushakova) of Diveyevo (1904)
 Repose of Archimandrite Spyridon (Efimov) (1984), disciple of St. John of Shanghai and San Francisco.

Icon gallery

Notes

References

Sources
 August 19 / September 1. Orthodox Calendar (PRAVOSLAVIE.RU).
 September 1 / August 19. Holy Trinity Russian Orthodox Church (A parish of the Patriarchate of Moscow).
 August 19. OCA - The Lives of the Saints.
 The Autonomous Orthodox Metropolia of Western Europe and the Americas (ROCOR). St. Hilarion Calendar of Saints for the year of our Lord 2004. St. Hilarion Press (Austin, TX). p. 61.
 Menologion: The Nineteenth Day Day of the Month of August. Orthodoxy in China.
 The Passion of Saint Andrew the Commander. pp. 1–16. Retrieved: 1 October 2014.
 August 19. Latin Saints of the Orthodox Patriarchate of Rome.
 The Roman Martyrology. Transl. by the Archbishop of Baltimore. Last Edition, According to the Copy Printed at Rome in 1914. Revised Edition, with the Imprimatur of His Eminence Cardinal Gibbons. Baltimore: John Murphy Company, 1916. pp. 248–250.
 Rev. Richard Stanton. A Menology of England and Wales, or, Brief Memorials of the Ancient British and English Saints Arranged According to the Calendar, Together with the Martyrs of the 16th and 17th Centuries. London: Burns & Oates, 1892. pp. 399–401.

 Greek Sources
 Great Synaxaristes:  19 ΑΥΓΟΥΣΤΟΥ. ΜΕΓΑΣ ΣΥΝΑΞΑΡΙΣΤΗΣ.
  Συναξαριστής. 19 Αυγούστου. ECCLESIA.GR. (H ΕΚΚΛΗΣΙΑ ΤΗΣ ΕΛΛΑΔΟΣ). 

 Russian Sources
  1 сентября (19 августа). Православная Энциклопедия под редакцией Патриарха Московского и всея Руси Кирилла (электронная версия). (Orthodox Encyclopedia - Pravenc.ru).

August in the Eastern Orthodox calendar